Herman Bultos (19 August 1752 in Brussels – 30 June 1801 in Hamburg-Billwerder) was an 18th-century Belgian wine merchant and theatre director.

Life
The younger brother of the actor Alexandre Bultos, Herman became co-head of Brussels' Théâtre de la Monnaie in 1783, with Alexandre for 4 years, then alone from 1787 to 1791, then with Jean-Pierre-Paul Adam from 1791 to 1793 and again in 1794.

Leaving Brussels during the troubles of the 1787-90 Brabant Revolution, Bultos arrived in Hamburg with several actors from the Théâtre de la Monnaie.  There they founded a francophone theatre which lasted until 1798.  Bultos was then taken on at the court of prince Henry of Prussia at Rheinsberg, but only acted there for 2 years.

References 
 Henrie Liebrecht: Histoire Du Theatre Francais. Slatkine Reprints. Genève 1977. p. 353-354.

1752 births
1801 deaths
Businesspeople from Brussels
Directors of La Monnaie
Businesspeople of the Austrian Netherlands